

Events

Pre-1600
70 – Siege of Jerusalem: Titus, son of emperor Vespasian, storms the Fortress of Antonia north of the Temple Mount. The Roman army is drawn into street fights with the Zealots.
 792 – Kardam of Bulgaria defeats Byzantine Emperor Constantine VI at the Battle of Marcellae.
 911 – Rollo lays siege to Chartres.
1189 – Richard I of England officially invested as Duke of Normandy.
1225 – Treaty of San Germano is signed at San Germano between Holy Roman Emperor Frederick II and Pope Gregory IX. A Dominican named Guala is responsible for the negotiations.
1398 – The Battle of Kellistown was fought on this day between the forces of the English led by Roger Mortimer, 4th Earl of March against the O'Byrnes and O'Tooles under the command of Art Óg mac Murchadha Caomhánach, the most powerful Chieftain in Leinster.
1402 – Ottoman-Timurid Wars: Battle of Ankara: Timur, ruler of Timurid Empire, defeats forces of the Ottoman Empire sultan Bayezid I.
1592 – During the first Japanese invasion of Korea, Japanese forces led by Toyotomi Hideyoshi captured Pyongyang, although they were ultimately unable to hold it.

1601–1900
1705 – A fire in Oulu, Finland almost completely destroyed the fourth district, which covered the southern part of the city and was by far the largest of the city districts.
1715 – Seventh Ottoman–Venetian War: The Ottoman Empire captures Nauplia, the capital of the Republic of Venice's "Kingdom of the Morea", thereby opening the way to the swift Ottoman reconquest of the Morea.
1738 – Canadian explorer Pierre Gaultier de Varennes et de La Vérendrye reaches the western shore of Lake Michigan.
1799 – Tekle Giyorgis I begins his first of six reigns as Emperor of Ethiopia.
1807 – Nicéphore Niépce is awarded a patent by Napoleon for the Pyréolophore, the world's first internal combustion engine, after it successfully powered a boat upstream on the river Saône in France.
1810 – Citizens of Bogotá, New Granada declare independence from Spain.
1831 – Seneca and Shawnee people agree to relinquish their land in western Ohio for 60,000 acres west of the Mississippi River.
1848 – The first Women's Rights Convention in Seneca Falls, New York, a two-day event, concludes.
1864 – American Civil War: Battle of Peachtree Creek: Near Atlanta, Georgia, Confederate forces led by General John Bell Hood unsuccessfully attack Union troops under General William T. Sherman.
1866 – Austro-Prussian War: Battle of Lissa: The Austrian Navy, led by Admiral Wilhelm von Tegetthoff, defeats the Italian Navy near the island of Vis in the Adriatic Sea.
1871 – British Columbia joins the confederation of Canada.
1885 – The Football Association legalizes professionalism in association football under pressure from the British Football Association.

1901–present
1903 – The Ford Motor Company ships its first automobile.
1906 – In Finland, a new electoral law is ratified, guaranteeing the country the first and equal right to vote in the world. Finnish women are the first in Europe to receive the right to vote.
1917 – World War I: The Corfu Declaration, which leads to the creation of the post-war Kingdom of Yugoslavia, is signed by the Yugoslav Committee and Kingdom of Serbia.
1920 – The Greek Army takes control of Silivri after Greece is awarded the city by the Paris Peace Conference; by 1923 Greece effectively lost control to the Turks.
1922 – The League of Nations awards mandates of Togoland to France and Tanganyika to the United Kingdom.
1932 – In the Preußenschlag, German President Hindenburg places Prussia directly under the rule of the national government.
1934 – Labor unrest in the U.S.: Police in Minneapolis fire upon striking truck drivers, during the Minneapolis Teamsters Strike of 1934, killing two and wounding sixty-seven.
  1934   – West Coast waterfront strike: In Seattle, police fire tear gas on and club 2,000 striking longshoremen. The governor of Oregon calls out the National Guard to break a strike on the Portland docks.
1935 – Switzerland: A Royal Dutch Airlines plane en route from Milan to Frankfurt crashes into a Swiss mountain, killing thirteen.
1936 – The Montreux Convention is signed in Switzerland, authorizing Turkey to fortify the Dardanelles and Bosphorus but guaranteeing free passage to ships of all nations in peacetime.
1938 – The United States Department of Justice files suit in New York City against the motion picture industry charging violations of the Sherman Antitrust Act in regards to the studio system.  The case would eventually result in a break-up of the industry in 1948.
1940 – Denmark leaves the League of Nations.
  1940   – California opens its first freeway, the Arroyo Seco Parkway.
1941 – Soviet leader Joseph Stalin consolidates the Commissariats of Home Affairs and National Security to form the NKVD and names Lavrentiy Beria its chief.
1944 – World War II: Adolf Hitler survives an assassination attempt led by German Army Colonel Claus von Stauffenberg.
1949 – The Israel–Syria Mixed Armistice Commission brokers the last of four ceasefire agreements to end the 1948 Arab–Israeli War.
1950 – Cold War: In Philadelphia, Harry Gold pleads guilty to spying for the Soviet Union by passing secrets from atomic scientist Klaus Fuchs.
  1950   – After a month-long campaign, the majority of North Korea's Air Force was destroyed by anti-communist forces. 
1951 – King Abdullah I of Jordan is assassinated by a Palestinian while attending Friday prayers in Jerusalem.
1954 – Germany: Otto John, head of West Germany's secret service, defects to East Germany.
1960 – Ceylon (now Sri Lanka) elects Sirimavo Bandaranaike Prime Minister, the world's first elected female head of government.
1961 – French military forces break the Tunisian siege of Bizerte.
1964 – Vietnam War: Viet Cong forces attack the capital of Định Tường Province, Cái Bè, killing 11 South Vietnamese military personnel and 40 civilians (30 of whom are children).
1968 – The first International Special Olympics Summer Games are held at Soldier Field in Chicago, with about 1,000 athletes with intellectual disabilities.
1969 – Apollo program: Apollo 11's crew successfully makes the first manned landing on the Moon in the Sea of Tranquility. Americans Neil Armstrong and Buzz Aldrin become the first humans to walk on the Moon six and a half hours later.
  1969   – A cease fire is announced between Honduras and El Salvador, six days after the beginning of the "Football War".
1974 – Turkish invasion of Cyprus: Forces from Turkey invade Cyprus after a coup d'état, organised by the dictator of Greece, against president Makarios.
1976 – The American Viking 1 lander successfully lands on Mars.
1977 – The Central Intelligence Agency releases documents under the Freedom of Information Act revealing it had engaged in mind-control experiments.
  1977   – The Johnstown flood of 1977 kills 84 people and causes millions of dollars in damages. 
1981 – Somali Airlines Flight 40 crashes in the Balad District of Somalia, killing 40 people.  
1982 – Hyde Park and Regent's Park bombings: The Provisional IRA detonates two bombs in Hyde Park and Regent's Park in central London, killing eight soldiers, wounding forty-seven people, and leading to the deaths of seven horses.
1985 – The government of Aruba passes legislation to secede from the Netherlands Antilles.
1989 – Burma's ruling junta puts opposition leader Aung San Suu Kyi under house arrest.
1992 – Václav Havel resigns as president of Czechoslovakia.
1997 – The fully restored  (a.k.a. Old Ironsides) celebrates its 200th birthday by setting sail for the first time in 116 years.
1999 – The Chinese Communist Party begins a persecution campaign against Falun Gong, arresting thousands nationwide.
2005 – The Civil Marriage Act legalizes same-sex marriage in Canada. 
2012 – James Holmes opened fire at a movie theater in Aurora, Colorado, killing 12 and injuring 70 others.
  2012   – Syrian civil war: The People's Protection Units (YPG) capture the cities of Amuda and Efrîn without resistance.
2013 – Seventeen government soldiers are killed in an attack by FARC revolutionaries in the Colombian department of Arauca.
  2013   – Syrian civil war: The Battle of Ras al-Ayn ends with the expulsion of Islamist forces from the city by the People's Protection Units (YPG).
2015 – A huge explosion in the mostly Kurdish border town of Suruç, Turkey, targeting the Socialist Youth Associations Federation, kills at least 31 people and injures over 100.
  2015   – The United States and Cuba resume full diplomatic relations after five decades.
2017 – O. J. Simpson is granted parole to be released from prison after serving nine years of a 33-year sentence after being convicted of armed robbery in Las Vegas.
2021 – American businessman Jeff Bezos flies to space aboard New Shepard  NS-16 operated by his private spaceflight company Blue Origin.

Births

Pre-1600
 682 – Taichō, Japanese monk and scholar (d. 767)
1304 – Petrarch, Italian poet and scholar (d. 1374)
1313 – John Tiptoft, 2nd Baron Tibetot (d. 1367)
1346 – Margaret, Countess of Pembroke, daughter of King Edward III of England (d. 1361)
1470 – John Bourchier, 1st Earl of Bath, English noble (d. 1539)
1519 – Pope Innocent IX (d. 1591)
1537 – Arnaud d'Ossat, French cardinal (d. 1604)
1583 – Alban Roe, English Benedictine martyr (d. 1642)
1591 – Anne Hutchinson, English Puritan preacher (d. 1643)
1592 – Johan Björnsson Printz, governor of New Sweden (d. 1663)

1601–1900
1601 – Robert Wallop, English politician (d. 1667)
1620 – Nikolaes Heinsius the Elder, Dutch poet and scholar (d. 1681)
1649 – William Bentinck, 1st Earl of Portland (d. 1709)
1754 – Antoine Destutt de Tracy, French philosopher and academic (d. 1836)
1757 – Garsevan Chavchavadze, Georgian politician and diplomat (d. 1811)
1762 – Jakob Haibel, Austrian tenor and composer (d. 1826)
1774 – Auguste de Marmont, French general (d. 1852)
1789 – Mahmud II, Ottoman sultan (d. 1839)
1804 – Richard Owen, English biologist, anatomist, and paleontologist (d. 1892)
1822 – Gregor Mendel, Austro-German monk, geneticist and botanist (d. 1884)
1838 – Augustin Daly, American playwright and manager (d. 1899)
1830 – Clements Markham, English explorer (d. 1916)
  1838   – William Paine Lord, American lawyer and politician, 9th Governor of Oregon (d. 1911)
  1838   – Sir George Trevelyan, 2nd Baronet, English civil servant and politician, Chancellor of the Duchy of Lancaster (d. 1928)
1847 – Max Liebermann, German painter and academic (d. 1935)
1849 – Robert Anderson Van Wyck, American lawyer and politician, 91st Mayor of New York City (d. 1918)
1852 – Theo Heemskerk, Dutch lawyer and politician, Prime Minister of the Netherlands (d. 1932)
1854 – Philomène Belliveau, Canadian artist (d. 1940)
1864 – Erik Axel Karlfeldt, Swedish poet, Nobel Prize laureate (d. 1931)
  1864   – Ruggero Oddi,  Italian physiologist and anatomist (d. 1913)
1868 – Miron Cristea, Romanian cleric and politician, 38th Prime Minister of Romania (d. 1939)
1873 – Alberto Santos-Dumont, Brazilian pilot (d. 1932)
1876 – Otto Blumenthal, German mathematician and academic (d. 1944)
1877 – Tom Crean, Irish sailor and explorer (d. 1938)
1882 – Olga Hahn-Neurath, Austrian mathematician and philosopher (d. 1937)
1889 – John Reith, 1st Baron Reith, Scottish broadcaster, co-founded BBC (d. 1971)
1890 – Verna Felton, American actress (d. 1966)
  1890   – Julie Vinter Hansen, Danish-Swiss astronomer and academic (d. 1960)
  1890   – Giorgio Morandi, Italian painter (d. 1964)    
1893 – George Llewelyn Davies, English soldier (d. 1915)
1895 – László Moholy-Nagy, Hungarian painter, photographer, and sculptor (d. 1946)
1897 – Tadeusz Reichstein, Polish-Swiss chemist and academic, Nobel Prize laureate (d. 1996)
1900 – Maurice Leyland, English cricketer and coach (d. 1967)

1901–present
1901 – Vehbi Koç, Turkish businessman and philanthropist, founded Koç Holding (d. 1996)
  1901   – Eugenio Lopez Sr., Filipino businessman and founder of the Lopez Group of Companies (d. 1975)
  1901   – Heinie Manush, American baseball player and manager (d. 1971)
1902 – Leonidas Berry, American gastroenterologist (d. 1995)
1905 – Joseph Levis, American foil fencer (d. 2005)
1909 – Eric Rowan, South African cricketer (d. 1993)
1910 – Vilém Tauský, Czech-English conductor and composer (d. 2004)
1911 – Baqa Jilani, Indian cricketer (d. 1941)
  1911   – José Zabala-Santos, Filipino author and illustrator (d. 1985)
  1911   – Loda Halama, Polish dancer and actress (d. 1996)
1912 – George Johnston, Australian journalist and author (d. 1970)
1914 – Dobri Dobrev, Bulgarian philanthropist (d. 2018)
  1914   – Charilaos Florakis, Greek politician (d. 2005)
  1914   – Ersilio Tonini, Italian cardinal (d. 2013)
1918 – Cindy Walker, American singer-songwriter and dancer (d. 2006)
1919 – Edmund Hillary, New Zealand mountaineer and explorer (d. 2008)
  1919   – Jacquemine Charrott Lodwidge, English writer (d. 2012)
1920 – Elliot Richardson, American lieutenant and politician, 11th United States Secretary of Defense (d. 1999)
1921 – Henri Alleg, English-French journalist and author (d. 2013)
1922 – Alan Stephenson Boyd, American lawyer and politician, 1st United States Secretary of Transportation (d. 2020)
1923 – Stanisław Albinowski, Polish economist and journalist (d. 2005)
1924 – Lola Albright, American actress and singer (d. 2017)
  1924   – Thomas Berger, American author and playwright (d. 2014)
  1924   – Mort Garson, Canadian-American songwriter and composer (d. 2008)
1925 – Jacques Delors, French economist and politician, 8th President of the European Commission
  1925   – Frantz Fanon, French–Algerian psychiatrist and philosopher (d. 1961)
1927 – Barbara Bergmann, American economist and academic (d. 2015)
  1927   – Heather Chasen, English actress (d. 2020)
  1927   – Michael Gielen, Austrian conductor and composer (d. 2019)
  1927   – Ian P. Howard, English-Canadian psychologist and academic (d. 2013)
1928 – Józef Czyrek, Polish economist and politician, Polish Minister of Foreign Affairs (d. 2013)
  1928   – Belaid Abdessalam, Prime Minister of Algeria (d. 2020)
1929 – Hazel Hawke, Australian social worker and pianist, 23rd Spouse of the Prime Minister of Australia (d. 2013)
  1929   – Mike Ilitch, American businessman, co-founded Little Caesars (d. 2017)
  1929   – Rajendra Kumar, Pakistani-Indian actor and producer (d. 1999)
  1929   – David Tonkin, Australian politician, 38th Premier of South Australia (d. 2000)
1930 – Giannis Agouris, Greek journalist and author (d. 2006)
  1930   – Chuck Daly, American basketball player and coach (d. 2009)
  1930   – William H. Goetzmann, American historian and author (d. 2010)
  1930   – Sally Ann Howes, English-American singer and actress (d. 2021)
1931 – Tony Marsh, English race car driver (d. 2009)
1932 – Nam June Paik, American artist (d. 2006)
  1932   – Otto Schily, German lawyer and politician, German Minister of the Interior
1933 – Buddy Knox, American singer-songwriter and guitarist (d. 1999)
  1933   – Cormac McCarthy, American novelist, playwright, and screenwriter
  1933   – Rex Williams, English snooker player
1935 – Peter Palumbo, Baron Palumbo, English businessman and art collector
1936 – Alistair MacLeod, Canadian novelist and short story writer (d. 2014)
  1936   – Barbara Mikulski, American social worker and politician
1938 – Deniz Baykal, Turkish lawyer and politician, Deputy Prime Minister of Turkey (d. 2023)
  1938   – Roger Hunt, English footballer (d. 2021)
  1938   – Tony Oliva, Cuban-American baseball player and coach
  1938   – Diana Rigg, English actress (d. 2020)
  1938   – Natalie Wood, American actress (d. 1981)
1939 – Judy Chicago, American feminist artist
1941 – Don Chuy, American football player (d. 2014)
  1941   – Periklis Korovesis, Greek author and journalist (d. 2020)
  1941   – Kurt Raab, German actor, screenwriter, and production designer (d. 1988)
1942 – Pete Hamilton, American race car driver (d. 2017)
1943 – Chris Amon, New Zealand race car driver (d. 2016)
  1943   – Bob McNab, English footballer
  1943   – Adrian Păunescu, Romanian poet, journalist, and politician (d. 2010)
  1943   – Wendy Richard, English actress (d. 2009)
1944 – Mel Daniels, American basketball player and coach (d. 2015)
  1944   – W. Cary Edwards, American politician (d. 2010)
  1944   – Olivier de Kersauson, French sailor
  1944   – T. G. Sheppard, American country music singer-songwriter
1945 – Charles Bowden, American non-fiction author, journalist and essayist (d. 2014)
  1945   – Kim Carnes, American singer-songwriter
  1945   – Larry Craig, American soldier and politician
  1945   – John Lodge, English singer-songwriter, bass player, and producer 
  1945   – Bo Rein, American football player and coach (d. 1980)
1946 – Randal Kleiser, American actor, director, and producer 
1947 – Gerd Binnig, German physicist and academic, Nobel Prize laureate
  1947   – Carlos Santana, Mexican-American singer-songwriter and guitarist 
1948 – Muse Watson, American actor and producer
1950 – Edward Leigh, English lawyer and politician
  1950   – Lucille Lemay, Canadian archer
1951 – Jeff Rawle, English actor and screenwriter
1953 – Dave Evans, Welsh-Australian singer-songwriter 
  1953   – Thomas Friedman, American journalist and author
  1953   – Marcia Hines, American-Australian singer and actress
1954 – Moira Harris, American actress
  1954   – Jay Jay French, American guitarist and producer 
1955 – Desmond Douglas, Jamaican-English table tennis player
  1955   – René-Daniel Dubois, Canadian actor and playwright
  1955   – Jem Finer, English banjo player and songwriter 
1956 – Paul Cook, English drummer 
  1956   – Thomas N'Kono, Cameroonian footballer
  1956   – Jim Prentice, Canadian lawyer and politician, 16th Premier of Alberta (d. 2016)
1958 – Mick MacNeil, Scottish keyboard player and songwriter
  1958   – Billy Mays, American salesman (d. 2009)
1959 – Radney Foster, American singer-songwriter, guitarist, and producer 
1960 – Claudio Langes, Italian race car driver
  1960   – Prvoslav Vujčić, Serbian-Canadian poet and philosopher
  1960   – Sudesh Berry, Indian actor
1961 – Óscar Elías Biscet, Cuban physician and activist, founded the Lawton Foundation
1962 – Carlos Alazraqui, American actor, producer, and screenwriter
  1962   – Giovanna Amati, Italian race car driver
  1962   – Julie Bindel, English journalist, author, and academic
1963 – Frank Whaley, American actor, director, and screenwriter
1964 – Chris Cornell, American singer-songwriter and guitarist (d. 2017)
  1964   – Terri Irwin, American-Australian zoologist and author
  1964   – Sebastiano Rossi, Italian footballer
  1964   – Bernd Schneider, German race car driver
1965 – Jess Walter, American journalist and author
1966 – Anton Du Beke, English dancer and presenter
1966 – Stone Gossard, American singer-songwriter and guitarist 
  1966   – Enrique Peña Nieto, Mexican lawyer and politician, 57th President of Mexico
1967 – Courtney Taylor-Taylor, American singer-songwriter and guitarist 
1968 – Jimmy Carson, American ice hockey player
  1968   – Hami Mandıralı, Turkish footballer and manager
  1968   – Kool G Rap, American hip-hop artist
1969 – Josh Holloway, American actor 
  1969   – Kreso Kovacec, Croatian-German footballer
  1969   – Giovanni Lombardi, Italian cyclist
  1969   – Joon Park, South Korean-American singer
  1969   – Tobi Vail, American singer and guitarist 
1971 – Charles Johnson, American baseball player
  1971   – Sandra Oh, Canadian actress 
1972 – Jamie Ainscough, Australian rugby league player
  1972   – Jozef Stümpel, Slovak ice hockey player
  1972   – Erik Ullenhag, Swedish jurist and politician
  1972   – Vitamin C, American singer-songwriter
1973 – Omar Epps, American actor
  1973   – Haakon, Crown Prince of Norway
  1973   – Peter Forsberg, Swedish ice hockey player and manager
  1973   – Nixon McLean, Caribbean cricketer
  1973   – Roberto Orci, Mexican-American screenwriter and producer
  1973   – Claudio Reyna, American soccer player
1975 – Ray Allen, American basketball player and actor
  1975   – Judy Greer, American actress and producer
  1975   – Erik Hagen, Norwegian footballer
  1975   – Birgitta Ohlsson, Swedish journalist and politician, 5th Swedish Minister for European Union Affairs
  1975   – Jason Raize, American singer and actor (d. 2004)
  1975   – Yusuf Şimşek, Turkish footballer and manager
1976 – Erica Hill, American journalist
  1976   – Debashish Mohanty, Indian cricketer and coach
  1976   – Andrew Stockdale, Australian singer-songwriter and guitarist 
  1976   – Alex Yoong, Malaysian race car driver
1977 – Kiki Musampa, Congolese footballer
  1977   – Yves Niaré, French shot putter (d. 2012)
  1977   – Alessandro Santos, Brazilian-Japanese footballer
1978 – Pavel Datsyuk, Russian ice hockey player
  1978   – Will Solomon, American basketball player
  1978   – Elliott Yamin, American singer-songwriter
  1978   – Ieva Zunda, Latvian runner and hurdler
1979 – Miklós Fehér, Hungarian footballer (d. 2004)
  1979   – Charlotte Hatherley, English singer-songwriter and guitarist 
  1979   – David Ortega, Spanish swimmer
1980 – Tesfaye Bramble, English-Montserratian footballer
  1980   – Gisele Bündchen, Brazilian model, fashionista, and businesswoman 
1981 – Viktoria Ladõnskaja, Estonian journalist and politician
1982 – Antoine Vermette, Canadian ice hockey player
1984 – Alexi Casilla, Dominican baseball player
  1984   – Matt Gilroy, American ice hockey player
1985 – John Francis Daley, American actor and screenwriter
  1985   – Harley Morenstein, Canadian actor and YouTube personality
  1985   – David Mundy, Australian footballer
1986 – Osric Chau, Canadian actor, director, producer, and screenwriter
1987 – Nicola Benedetti, Scottish violinist
  1987   – Niall McGinn, Irish footballer
1988 – Julianne Hough, American singer-songwriter, actress, and dancer
  1988   – Stephen Strasburg, American baseball player
  1988   – Shahram Mahmoudi, Iranian volleyball player
1989 – Javier Cortés, Mexican footballer
  1989   – Cristian Pasquato, Italian footballer
1990 – Lars Unnerstall, German footballer
1991 – Chiyoshōma Fujio, Mongolian sumo wrestler
  1991   – Ryan James, Australian rugby league player
  1991   – Kira Kazantsev, Miss America 2015
  1991   – Philipp Reiter, German mountaineer and runner
  1991   – Tawan Vihokratana, Thai actor, host, and model
1993 – Steven Adams, New Zealand basketball player
  1993   – Nick Cousins, Canadian ice hockey player
1995 – Moses Leota, New Zealand rugby league player
1996 – Ben Simmons, Australian basketball player
1999 – Pop Smoke, American rapper and singer (d. 2020)

Deaths

Pre-1600
 518 – Amantius, Byzantine grand chamberlain and Monophysite martyr
 833 – Ansegisus, Frankish abbot and saint
 985 – Boniface VII, antipope of Rome
1031 – Robert II, king of France (b. 972)
1156 – Toba, emperor of Japan (b. 1103)
1320 – Oshin, king of Armenia (b. 1282)
1332 – Thomas Randolph, 1st Earl of Moray, regent of Scotland
1387 – Robert IV, French nobleman (b. 1356)
1398 – Roger Mortimer, 4th Earl of March, Welsh nobleman (b. 1374)
1405 – Alexander Stewart, Earl of Buchan, fourth son of King Robert II of Scotland (approximate, b. 1343)
1453 – Enguerrand de Monstrelet, French historian and author (b. 1400)
1454 – John II, king of Castile and León (b. 1405)
1514 – György Dózsa, Transylvanian peasant revolt leader (b. 1470)
1524 – Claude, queen consort of France (b. 1499)
1526 – García Jofre de Loaísa, Spanish explorer (b. 1490)
1600 – William More, English courtier (b. 1520)

1601–1900
1616 – Hugh O'Neill, Earl of Tyrone, Irish nobleman and rebel soldier (b. 1550)
1704 – Peregrine White, English-American farmer and soldier (b. 1620)
1752 – Johann Christoph Pepusch, German-English composer and theorist (b. 1667)
1816 – Gavrila Derzhavin, Russian poet and politician (b. 1743)
1866 – Bernhard Riemann, German mathematician and academic (b. 1826)
1897 – Jean Ingelow, English poet and author (b. 1820)

1901–present
1901 – William Cosmo Monkhouse, English poet and critic (b. 1840)
1903 – Leo XIII, pope of the Catholic Church (b. 1810)
1908 – Demetrius Vikelas, Greek businessman and author (b. 1835)
  1908   – Karl Bernhard Zoeppritz, German geophysicist and seismologist (b. 1881)
1910 – Anderson Dawson, Australian politician, 14th Premier of Queensland (b. 1863)
1917 – Ignaz Sowinski, Galician architect (b. 1858)
1922 – Andrey Markov, Russian mathematician and theorist (b. 1856)
1923 – Pancho Villa, Mexican general and politician, Governor of Chihuahua (b. 1878)
1926 – Felix Dzerzhinsky, Russian educator and politician (b. 1877)
1927 – Ferdinand I, king of Romania (b. 1865)
1928 – Kostas Karyotakis, Greek poet and author (b. 1896)
1932 – René Bazin, French author and academic (b. 1853)
1937 – Olga Hahn-Neurath, Austrian mathematician and philosopher from the Vienna Circle (b. 1882)
  1937   – Guglielmo Marconi, Italian physicist and engineer, Nobel Prize laureate (b. 1874)
1941 – Lew Fields, American actor and producer (b. 1867)
1944 – Ludwig Beck, German general (b. 1880)
1944 – Mildred Harris, American actress (b. 1901)  
1945 – Paul Valéry, French author and poet (b. 1871)
1951 – Abdullah I, king of Jordan (b. 1882)
1953 – Dumarsais Estimé, Haitian lawyer and politician, 33rd President of Haiti (b. 1900)
  1953   – Jan Struther, English author and hymn-writer (b. 1901)
1955 – Calouste Gulbenkian, Armenian businessman and philanthropist (b. 1869)
1956 – James Alexander Calder, Canadian educator and politician, Canadian Minister of Militia and Defence (b. 1868)
1959 – William D. Leahy, American admiral and diplomat, United States Ambassador to France (b. 1875)
1965 – Batukeshwar Dutt, Indian activist (b. 1910)
1968 – Bray Hammond, American historian and author (b. 1886)
1970 – Iain Macleod, English journalist and politician, Chancellor of the Exchequer (b. 1913)
1972 – Geeta Dutt, Indian singer and actress (b. 1930)
1973 – Bruce Lee, American actor and martial artist (b. 1940)
  1973   – Robert Smithson, American photographer and sculptor (b. 1938)
1974 – Allen Jenkins, American actor and singer (b. 1900)
  1974   – Kamal Dasgupta, Bengali music director, composer and folk artist. (b. 1912)
1976 – Joseph Rochefort, American captain and cryptanalyst (b. 1900)
1977 – Gary Kellgren, American record producer, co-founded Record Plant (b. 1939)
1980 – Maria Martinez, San Ildefonso Pueblo (Native American) potter (b. 1887)
1981 – Kostas Choumis, Greek-Romanian footballer (b. 1913)
1983 – Frank Reynolds, American soldier and journalist (b. 1923)
1987 – Richard Egan, American soldier and actor (b. 1921)
1989 – Forrest H. Anderson, American judge and politician, 17th Governor of Montana (b. 1913)
1990 – Herbert Turner Jenkins, American police officer (b. 1907)
1993 – Vince Foster, American lawyer and political figure (b. 1945)
1994 – Paul Delvaux, Belgian painter (b. 1897)
1997 – M. E. H. Maharoof, Sri Lankan politician (b. 1939)
1998 – June Byers, American wrestler  (b. 1922)
1999 – Sandra Gould, American actress (b. 1916)
2002 – Michalis Kritikopoulos, Greek footballer (b. 1946)
2003 – Nicolas Freeling, English author (b. 1927)
2004 – Lala Mara, Fijian politician (b. 1931)
  2004   – Valdemaras Martinkėnas, Lithuanian footballer and coach (b. 1965)
2005 – James Doohan, Canadian-American actor (b. 1920)
  2005   – Finn Gustavsen, Norwegian journalist and politician (b. 1926)
  2005   – Kayo Hatta, American director and cinematographer (b. 1958)
2006 – Ted Grant, South African-English theorist and activist (b. 1913)
  2006   – Gérard Oury, French actor, director, and producer (b. 1919)
2007 – Tammy Faye Messner, American Christian evangelist and talk show host (b. 1942)
2008 – Artie Traum, American guitarist, songwriter, and producer (b. 1943)
  2008   – Dinko Šakić, Croatian concentration camp commander (b. 1921)
2009 – Vedat Okyar, Turkish footballer (b. 1945)
  2009   – Mark Rosenzweig, American psychologist and academic (b. 1922)
2011 – Lucian Freud, German-English painter and illustrator (b. 1922)
2012 – Alastair Burnet, English journalist (b. 1928)
  2012   – Jack Davis, American hurdler (b. 1930)
  2012   – José Hermano Saraiva, Portuguese historian, jurist, and politician, Portuguese Minister of Education (b. 1919)
2013 – Pierre Fabre, French pharmacist and businessman, founded Laboratoires Pierre Fabre (b. 1926)
  2013   – Khurshed Alam Khan, Indian politician, 2nd Governor of Goa (b. 1919)
  2013   – Augustus Rowe, Canadian physician and politician (b. 1920)
  2013   – Helen Thomas, American journalist and author (b. 1920)
2014 – Victor G. Atiyeh, American businessman and politician, 32nd Governor of Oregon (b. 1923)
  2014   – Constantin Lucaci, Romanian sculptor and educator (b. 1923)
  2014   – Bob McNamara, American football player (b. 1931)
  2014   – Klaus Schmidt, German archaeologist and academic (b. 1953)
2015 – Wayne Carson, American singer-songwriter and producer (b. 1943)
  2015   – Fred Else, English footballer and manager (b. 1933)
  2015   – Dieter Moebius, Swiss-German keyboard player and producer (b. 1944)
2016 – Radu Beligan, Romanian actor, director, and essayist (b. 1918)
2017 – Chester Bennington, American singer (b. 1976)
2020 – Michael Brooks, political commentator (b. 1983)

Holidays and observances
Birthday of Crown Prince Haakon Magnus (Norway)
Christian feast day:
 Ansegisus
 Apollinaris of Ravenna
 Aurelius
 Ealhswith (or Elswith)
 Elijah
 Elizabeth Cady Stanton, Amelia Bloomer, Sojourner Truth, and Harriet Ross Tubman (Episcopal Church (USA))
 John Baptist Yi (one of The Korean Martyrs)
 Margaret the Virgin
 Thorlac (relic translation)
 Wilgefortis (cult suppressed)
 July 20 (Eastern Orthodox liturgics)
Día del Amigo (Argentina, Brazil)
Engineer's Day (Costa Rica)
Independence Day, celebrates the independence declaration of Colombia from Spain in 1810.
International Chess Day
Lempira Day (Honduras)
Tree Planting Day (Central African Republic)

References

External links

 
 
 

Days of the year
July